Lu Ping, born in Kaohsiung in 1953, is a Taiwanese writer who writes under the pen name “Ping Lu”. Her writing encompasses a broad range of genres, including novels, essays, poems, commentary, and theater plays. She is also known in the Chinese-language world for her critique of social phenomenon, ranging from cultural development to gender issues and human rights. Over the past two decades, Ms. Lu has successfully established herself as a prominent novelist, columnist, and commentator in Taiwan.

Background
Ms. Lu graduated from the Department of Psychology, National Taiwan University, and gained a master's degree from the University of Iowa. While working as a statistician in the United States, she won first prize with her short story "Death in a Cornfield" in the 1983 United Daily News fiction competition. Her other works also won her many prizes, including a prize in prose and a prize in dramatic composition. In 2002, she published a novel about the death of a famous Taiwanese singer Teresa Teng entitled "When Will You Come Again?" (Chinese title: 何日君再來).

Literary works
Of her literary works, "Love and Revolution" (Chinese title: 行道天涯; The Chinese version first came out in 1995, while the English version was published by Columbia University Press in 2006)attracted the most attention. Ms. Lu re-imagines the lives of Sun Yat-sen and Soong Ching-ling, a legendary couple in modern China. She not only explores their marital relations, including their failings and desires, but also mentions Sun Yat-sen's political career and Soong Ching-ling's feelings of isolation and loneliness after her husband died. As Perry Link pointed out in his article entitled "Chinese Shadows" (published on November 16, 2006, by The New York Review), Ms. Lu also tries to find in Soong Ching-ling "the person buried under all the layers of image-making" and to "reconstruct a credible portrait" of the famous woman. He also said Ms. Lu "succeeds in showing the ordinary and sometimes repugnant details of Qingling's life," and that she "may or may not be accurate about Qingling's inner life, but she certainly writes with honesty and with penetration."

Her more recent works includes fiction "The River Darkens" (Chinese title: 黑水; published in 2015) and autobiographical essays collection "Heart Mandala" (Chinese title: 坦露的心; published in 2017).

Ambassador at Large 
Prior to becoming the director of Kwang Hwa Information and Cultural Center in January 2003, Ms. Lu had worked as an editorial writer for The China Times, spent many years lecturing on such subjects as feminism, cultural criticism, and news commentary at National Taiwan University and Taipei National University of the Arts, and served as ambassador-at-large for Taiwan for a few years.

Ms. Lu left her post in Kwang Hwa Information and Cultural Center in December 2009, but is continuously promoting cultural and economical exchanges between Taiwan and Hong Kong.

She is currently the chairman of Radio Taiwan International.

Bibliography
 Love & revolution : a novel about Soong Qingling and Sun Yat-sen. (translated by Nancy Du.) New York: Columbia University Press, c2006.

References

External links
 

1953 births
Taiwanese dramatists and playwrights
Living people
National Taiwan University alumni
Taiwanese women novelists
Taiwanese novelists
Chinese women poets
Writers from Kaohsiung
Diplomats of the Republic of China
Republic of China writers
Women dramatists and playwrights
20th-century Taiwanese women writers
21st-century Taiwanese women writers
Taiwanese women short story writers
20th-century Taiwanese short story writers